Underground Zerø is a British space rock band, based in Norfolk, UK. The band is also known as UZØ. While the band is often referred to as "Underground Zero" or "Underground Zer0" in print, the official name of the band includes the slashed zero in its name. Their sound is influenced by Hawkwind.

The nucleus of UZØ was started in 1979 by Andrew Rix (bass/vocals), Adrian Rix (keyboards), Judi Griggs (vocals), Brian Savage (drums) and Karl Dawson (guitar). From 1981, then known as Ground Zero, the group underwent several major changes. Brian left and was replaced by Mike (Mel) Melnyk and guitarist Paul Holden joined. In 1983 Mel left and was replaced by Sean Holden. The band featured on the UKs Tommy Vance’s Friday Rock Show on Radio 1 and during 1983-85 developed a large following in the new Psychedelic scene. At this point the name became Underground Zerø to avoid confusion with a R & B group in the London Area. They performed at the large open-air concert Anglia for Africa in Norwich in 1985, which also featured Hawkwind, Magnum, Amazulu, Eek-A-Mouse and Dean Friedman. Underground Zerø also performed at the last Stonehenge festival with Hawkwind and has featured on Hawkwind, Friends and Relations albums.  Although UZØ  never split up they stopped performing live in 1994.

In 2005, they resumed live performances, doing 3 gigs in the UK and released a CD, Powerplay, featuring remixed versions of the studio tracks from their two vinyl LPs plus one bonus track. At about the same time an unofficial CD entitled Never Reach the Stars appeared, containing the original unremastered mixes of all the tracks from their vinyl albums and single. Although this release was not officially sanctioned it does include three live and one studio tracks that are not on the official CD and is acknowledged on the band's website.

Performances include the 2006 Eastern Haze  Festival in Somerleyton Hall, UK. 2008 saw them perform alongside the legendary Hawkwind at the Hawkfest, at Honiton in Devon.  They regularly feature at Space Rock festivals such as "On Board The Craft" and "Jackdaw".

In November 2014, founder keyboardist Adrian Rix left the band, and their planned 2015 appearances at HawkEaster and Sonic Rock Solstice were cancelled.

Although everything seemed quiet from UZ0, a lot of work was happening in the background it took 3 years to finally get the new album finished. Sean had built a new home studio and this was used to complete the final mixing and master the album. An album that was Over 30 years in the making, 'Hunting Dogs' is Underground Zero's latest release. While maintaining the band's progressive, Space-rock style, this album delves into darker, sometimes historical, sometimes prophetic subjects. Science fiction meets historical tragedy amidst screaming guitars and swooping keyboards. the band suggests that you Listen to it loud - but probably not alone, the album was mastered and a release date set for early 2017.

The band began looking for a new Keyboard player and in late 2016 they were introduced to "Dr Bob" otherwise known as  Robert Fielder, Bobs audition was of a strange nature as it was conducted over the phone with Bob playing his synths to the band via his mobile phone, it quickly became apparent that Dr Bob was the man for the job.    

so in 2017, a new era for Underground Zerø began, on Saturday the 15th of March "Hunting Dogs" was officially released and on Sunday the 16th of March the band played their first gig with the new lineup at Hawkeaster ( a festival in Devon organised by space rock heroes Hawkwind )

The band have announced their intention to archive their entire back catalogue of space rock IN space rock...with the help of Lunar Mission One.  By using a digital time capsule to be buried deep in the moon, the band hope that future generations - or even civilisations - will be able to enjoy Underground Zerø for millennia to come!

Discography
1983. Ground Zerø. Cassette.  
1983. The Official Bootleg. Live Cassette. (featuring Hawkwind's Nik Turner).  
1984. Seven Light Years. 12" Single.   
1984. Never Reach the Stars. LP. Sharp 023. Flicknife Records.  
1985. Hawkwind, Friends and Relations  3.Sharp 024.Flicknife Records.
1986. Orbit 9. Cassette. Terry Hopkins. 
1986. Orbit 10. Interview/Fanzine Cassette. HT 111. Terry Hopkins.  
1986.	A Pretty Smart Way to Catch a Lobster. Live Compilation LP. Sharp 035. Flicknife Records.  
1986. Hawkfan 12. Compilation LP.  
1986. Through The Looking Glass. Live/Studio EP. Blunt 038. Flicknife Records.  
1987. Underground Zerø Live. Video. Under 002   
1988. The Best of Hawkwind, Friends and Relations. CD. Sharp 1724CD. Flicknife Records. (Re-released in 1994 by Emporio - EMPRCD 547.)
1994. From Year Zerø. CD. Under 003 
1995. Hawkwind, Friends and Relations  - The Rarities. Compilation CD. CDMGRAM 91. Anagram.  
1995. Forlorn & Lethal. Video. Under 004 
1996. Hawkwind, Friends and Relations  - Cosmic Travellers. CD. CDMGRAM 105 Anagram. Pinnacle.  
1999. The Elf & The Hawk CD BWRCD 026-2 Black Widow 
2005. Powerplay. CD. Under 005 
2005. Never Reach The Stars + CD BR187 Black Rose Records
2011. Hawklords, Friends And Relations: 30th Anniversary Volume - A New Dawn. CD. SHARPCDA11951. Flicknife Records
2017. Hunting Dogs, © Copyright - Underground Zero / Underground Zero (5029385843625) ASIN: B06XCJJ1QC

References

External links
Underground Zerø website
Underground Zerø on Facebook
Underground Zerø on Myspace
Underground Zerø on YouTube
http://rateyourmusic.com/artist/underground_zero
 

Musical groups established in 1979
English rock music groups
English space rock musical groups